The Locomotive Acts (or Red Flag Acts) were a series of Acts of Parliament in the United Kingdom regulating the use of mechanically propelled vehicles on British public highways during the latter part of the 19th century.

The first three, the Locomotives 1861, the Locomotives Act 1865 and Highways and Locomotives (Amendment) Act 1878,  contained restrictive measures on the manning and speed of operation of road vehicles; they also formalised many important road concepts such as vehicle registration, registration plates, speed limits, maximum vehicle weight over structures such as bridges, and the organisation of highway authorities.

The Locomotives on Highways Act 1896 provided legislation that allowed the automotive industry in the United Kingdom to develop soon after the development of the first practical automobile (see History of the automobile). The last "locomotive act" was the Locomotives Act 1898.

Background
The Highway Act 1835 and subsequent acts (Public Health Act 1875, Local Government Act 1888 and Local Government Act 1894) attempted to find satisfactory methods of maintaining roads since the UK turnpike trust system had failed following the UK railway boom.

There is evidence that the steam carriages' brakes and their wide tyres caused less damage to the roads than horse-drawn carriages because of the absence of horses' hooves striking the road and wheels which did not lock and drag.

It has been claimed that the restrictions in the earlier act were advocated by those with interests in the UK railway industry and horse-drawn carriages.

In addition to any concerns about the state of the roads, by the 1860s, there was concern that the widespread use of traction engines, such as road locomotives and agricultural engines, would endanger the safety of the public. It was feared that engines and their trailers might cause fatal accidents, scare horses, block narrow lanes, and disturb the locals by operating at night. Although all of these fears were justified and were soon realized, there was a gradual acceptance of the machines as they became more common in commerce.

Similar 'Red Flag' legislation was enacted in some states in the United States.

The emerging UK automotive industry advocated very effectively for the 1896 Act during the preceding year. Coventry manufacturer Harry J. Lawson, who had purchased the British Daimler engine patents in 1895 and later was to form The Daimler Motor Company, was very influential. Economic historian Kenneth Richardson has suggested that the 1896 Act may have been written by Sir David Salomons, the founder of the Self-Propelled Traffic Association, on his assumption that no government department personnel would have had the necessary experience to do so themselves.

The Acts

Locomotive Act 1861

An Act for regulating the use of locomotives on turnpike and other roads, and the tolls to be levied on such locomotives and on the waggons and carriages drawn or propelled by the same.
The Locomotives on Highways Act 1861 recognised that the use of "powered locomotives" on turnpikes and other roads would become commonplace, and that many existing laws (e.g. Turnpike, Highway acts) did not contain any provision for regulation or tolling of such vehicles.
The act contained sections on:
Toll fees of locomotives and their wagons: to be tolled at every 2 tons of vehicle weight, and equal to the respective tolls charged for horse-drawn vehicles. Vehicles with non-cylindrical wheels were to be charged 50% more. (Section 1)
Regulations on the minimum width of wheels of vehicles over 3 tons: and on maximum loads per wheel, and restrictions on vehicles thought to be damaging to roads. (Sections 3, 4, 5)
Regulations, restrictions, and procedures for compensation to trustees on the passage of locomotives over bridges and other structures for any damage caused thereon. (Section 7)
Requirement for the vehicle to consume its own smoke (Section 8)
Requirement for a road locomotive to be manned by at least two persons, with additional persons in charge of trains of wagons, as well as requirements for the vehicle to carry functional lights during nighttime. (Section 9)
A speed limit of 10 mph on open roads, or 5 mph in inhabited areas. (Section 11)
Requirement for the owners name, and the weight of the vehicle to be clearly displayed on the vehicle. (Section 12)

The act also set out the values of fines for breach of the regulations.

Locomotives Act 1865 (Red Flag Act)

An Act for farther regulating the use of Locomotives on Turnpike and other roads for Agricultural and other purposes.
The Locomotive Act 1865:
Stipulated that self-propelled vehicles should be accompanied by a crew of three;  if the vehicle was attached to two or more vehicles an additional person was to accompany the vehicles; a man with a red flag was to walk at least  ahead of each vehicle, who was also required to assist with the passage of horses and carriages. The vehicle was required to stop at the signal of the flagbearer. (Section 3)
Additionally vehicles were also required to have functional lights, and not sound whistles or blow off steam whilst on the road. (Section 3)
A speed limit of 4 mph (2 mph in towns) was imposed for road locomotives, with a fine of £10 for contravention. (Section 4)
The restricted road locomotive vehicles to 14 tons, and 9 ft in width, as well as requiring the vehicle to have wheels meeting the requirements of the 1861 act. (Section 5)

Highways and Locomotives (Amendment) Act 1878

An Act to amend the Law relating to Highways in England and the Acts relating to Locomotives on Roads; and for other purposes.
The Highways and Locomotives (Amendment) Act 1878 contained sections on:
Arrangements regarding the formation of 'highway districts'; stipulating that they should roughly correspond with rural sanitary districts, and allowing the sanitary authority to apply to manage the highway districts, taking over property, debts and liabilities relating to the highway. (Part I. 3-12)
De-turnpiked roads to become 'main roads' and half their maintenance cost paid through county rates. (Part I. 13)
Gave the highway authority powers to request that roads between towns, and roads to railway stations be classified as 'main roads' (Part I. 15)
Allow the county authority to contribute to the maintenance of bridges (Part I. 21-22)
Provisions to recover maintenance costs from road users operating heavy traffic and causing excess road wear. (Part I. 23)
Set out procedures for the highway authority to discontinue any unneeded roads. (Part I. 24)
Allowing the repeal and issue of bylaws relating to animal-drawn vehicles that might cause damage to the road; as well as regulations on gates and regulations on bicycles, and allowing the issue of fines relating to such byelaws. (Part I. 26)

The act also repealed and replaced with amendments part of the 1861 and 1865 Locomotive Acts; these included:
Section 3 of the 1861 act and section 5 of the Locomotive Act 1865 – clauses relating to the weight, length, and width of tyre of road locomotives (Part II. 28)
Section 8 of the 1861 act, requiring road locomotives to consume their own smoke was repealed and amended. (Part II. 30-31)

Locomotives on Highways Act 1896

The Locomotives on Highways Act 1896 introduced a 12 mph speed limit (8 to 16 mph at the local authority's discretion), speed limits were later increased by the Motor Car Act 1903.

Locomotives Act 1898

An Act to amend the Law with respect to the use of Locomotives on Highways, and with respect to extraordinary Traffic.
The 1898 Act required road users to affix signs displaying the weight of wagons; limited length of hauled road trains to three wagons without permission, and gave powers to road authorities to operate weighing machines for the weighing of road vehicles, as well as allowing fines for the contravention of the regulations, and allowed for compensation relating to delay caused by the weighing process. (Sections 2, 3 and 4 respectively)

The act also contained sections on:
Regulations relating to number of persons in attendance to road locomotives, assistance to passing horses or carriages, and the requirement for and proper form of illuminating lights (Section 5)
Allowing councils to restrict the passage on road locomotives and their wagons on crowded highways, and bridges (in case of damage), whilst allowing bridge restrictions to be lifted on the payment of costs relating to bridge strengthening (Section 6)
Gave the right of appeal to road locomotives operators on restrictions under the act of the 1861 act. (Section 7)
Restricted passing of locomotives on bridges (Section 8)
Required road locomotives used for haulage (excluding agricultural machines, and steam rollers) to be licensed by the county council, and set out the requirement for display of a license plate (Sections 9, 10, 11)

See also
Speed limit enforcement
United Kingdom enterprise law

References

Acts

Vehicle law
Road transport in the United Kingdom
United Kingdom Acts of Parliament 1861
1861 in transport
United Kingdom Acts of Parliament 1865
1865 in transport
United Kingdom Acts of Parliament 1878
1878 in transport
United Kingdom Acts of Parliament 1898
1898 in transport
Steam road vehicles
Transport policy in the United Kingdom
Traffic law